The Iowa Rock 'n' Roll Hall of Fame is a museum located in Arnolds Park, Iowa, and maintained by the non-profit Iowa Rock 'n' Roll Music Association (IRRMA). The mission of IRRMA is to "retain and honor the legacy of rock 'n' roll music and preserve the history of music in the state of Iowa."
Established in 1997, IRRMA inducts members into the Hall of Fame annually in one or more of these categories: Artists, Establishments, Establishment Owners, Media Personalities, Songwriters, Record Companies, Managers, and Agencies. The museum was opened in 2003.
Notable inductees include Chase, Billy Dale Fries, The Big Bopper, Buddy Holly, Ritchie Valens and The Everly Brothers.

History
IRRMA was founded in 1997 as the first state non-profit music association dedicated to rock 'n' roll of significance to the state. Inductions to the Hall of Fame began that year, with five bands, two ballrooms, and a radio station making up the inaugural class. In 2003, it became the first state music association to have a free-standing museum.

Inductees

Artists and bands
With the majority of the acts focused in the 1950s and 1960s, inductees include both Iowa-based acts such as the Velaires and regional and national acts of significant importance to the Iowa rock 'n' roll scene such as those that perished near Clear Lake, Iowa, during the Winter Dance Party Tour on February 3, 1959.

Ballrooms and venues
Recognizing the significance of venues such as the Surf Ballroom to rock 'n' roll history, they are accorded their own category in the Hall of Fame.

Other industry categories
Making up the record industry and the distribution and marketing of early rock 'n' roll, the Hall of Fame has separate categories for:
 Booking agents/promoters
 Composers
 Deejays
 Managers
 Media representatives
 Music stores
 Radio stations
 Record stores
 Record labels
 Recording studios
 Venue managers
 Venue owners
 Writers

Other categories
 IRRMA Lifetime Achievement Award
 Matousek Family Lifetime Achievement Award
 Members
 Spirit Award
 Support People
 Other

Museum
The museum "provides visitors with an in-depth look at Iowa’s rockin' roots through informative exhibits". It contains memorabilia from many of the inductees represented. It is open every day from Memorial Day to Labor Day and two days a week otherwise. Tours are available. In 2013, it was announced that a new 12,000 ft2 facility was being developed to house the museum.

See also
 List of music museums

References

State halls of fame in the United States
Halls of fame in Iowa
Rock and roll
Music halls of fame
Museums in Dickinson County, Iowa